This is a list of Portuguese prime ministers by time in office.

Of the 89 prime ministers, 7 have served more than 8 years while 55 have served less than 1 year.

António Oliveira Salazar served as Prime Minister for more than 36 years, whereas Francisco Fernandes Costa didn't even serve as Prime Minister because he refused to take the oath of office.


Rank by time in office

By party

See also
 List of prime ministers of Portugal
 List of presidents of Portugal
 Prime Minister of Portugal

External links
Governo de Portugal - Chefes de Estado

Portugal, Presidents
Presidents by time in office